Ovidiu is a Romanian given name derived from Latin Ovidius. The female form is Ovidia.

People named Ovidiu:
Ovidiu Burcă
Ovidiu Constantinescu
Ovidiu Dănănae
Ovidiu Ganț
Ovidiu Cornel Hanganu
Ovidiu Herea
Ovidiu Hoban
Ovidiu Iacov
Ovidiu Lipan
Ovidiu Maitec
Ovidiu Iuliu Moldovan
Ovidiu Papadima
Ovidiu Pecican
Ovidiu Petre
Ovidiu Ioan Silaghi
Ovidiu Stîngă
Ovidiu Stoianof
Ovidiu Toniţa

Places:
Ovidiu

Romanian masculine given names